Ned Romero (December 4, 1926 – November 4, 2017) was an American actor and opera singer who appeared in television and film.

Early childhood and education 
Romero was born on December 4, 1926 in Franklin, Louisiana, the seat of St. Mary Parish in South Louisiana, the son of Anna and Sidney Romero. His ancestry was Chitimacha Native American, as well as Spanish and French. Romero was a graduate of Louisiana State University, where he earned a master's degree in music.

Stage 
Romero began his career in 1943 as an opera singer, appearing in productions with the San Francisco Opera and in Los Angeles. He also appeared in musicals, such as Kiss Me, Kate, Kismet and Oklahoma!. On Broadway, he appeared in 3 for Tonight (1954).

Television 
After twenty years on the stage, he moved into television and film. His first television appearance was an opera skit on CBS's The Many Loves of Dobie Gillis with Dwayne Hickman, in which he performed a  medley of famous opera arias. His roles as a regular cast member on TV shows included portraying investigator Bob Ramirez on The D.A., Broken Foot on Born to the Wind and Sgt. John Rivera on Dan August.

He subsequently appeared in several films and television programs. His credits include appearances in The Munsters, Walker: Texas Ranger, Tarzan (1966 TV series)#Season 1: 1966–67, Star Trek: The Original Series, Star Trek: The Next Generation, Star Trek: Voyager, Custer, Police Woman, Land of the Lost, Kung Fu, The Six Million Dollar Man, Ironside, Death Valley Days, The Incredible Hulk, Adam-12, and Emergency!, and in an unaired episode of the short-lived series The New Land.

He also played the title role in a 1975 television drama of the life of Chief Joseph entitled: I Will Fight No More Forever. In 2006, he appeared in the feature film Expiration Date.

Personal life
Romero's second wife was singer and dancer Jolene Lontere. He died on November 4, 2017 at the age of 90 from an undisclosed illness.

Filmography

Film
The Talisman (1966) – The Indian
Winchester 73 (1967, TV Movie) – Wild Bear
The Violent Ones (1967) – Mendoza
Hang 'Em High (1968) – Charlie Blackfoot, Cooper Hanging Party
Mark of the Gun (1969)
Big Daddy (1969)
Tell Them Willie Boy Is Here (1969) – Tom
Gentle Savage (1973) – Richard Allen
I Will Fight No More Forever (1975, TV Movie) – Chief Joseph
The Last of the Mohicans (1977, TV Movie) – Chingachgook
The Deerslayer (1978, TV Movie) – Chingachgook
Sultan and the Rock Star (1980, TV Movie) – Big Joe Ironwood
Gone to Texas (1986, TV Movie) – Chief John Jolley
House IV (1992) – Ezra
Children of the Corn II: The Final Sacrifice (1992) – Frank Redbear
Fabulous Shiksa in Distress (2003) – Sam
Expiration Date (2006) – Old Native Man (final film role)

Television

The Virginian – episode – "Siege" – Angelo (1963)
McHale's Navy – episode – "The Great Eclipse" – The Fierce Native (1964) 
Get Smart – episode – "Survival of the Fattest" – Agent #2 (1965)
Shane – 6 episodes – Chips (1966)
The Munsters – episode 56 – "Heap Big Herman" -Wonga (1966)
Rango – episode – "Rango the Outlaw" – Hocker (1967)
Laredo – episode – "Enemies and Brothers" – Captain Montoya (1967)
The F.B.I. – episode – "The Extortionist" – Esteban Rodriguez (1967) 
Bonanza – episode – "In Defense of Honor" – White Wolf  (1968)
Star Trek – episode – "A Private Little War" –  Krell (1968)
The Hight Chaparral – episode – "For What We Are About To Receive" –  Carlos Mendoza (1968)
The Virginian – episode – "The Heritage" – Tza'Wuda (1968)
The F.B.I. – episode – "Southwind" – Alarcon (1968) 
Lancer – episode – "Cut the Wolf Loose" – Wichita Jim (1969)
The F.B.I. – episode – "The Patriot" – Jose Orledo (1969) 
Dan August – 26 episodes –  Det. Joe Rivera (1970–1971) 
The D.A. – episode – "The People vs. Drake" –  D.A. Investigator Bob Ramirez (1971)
Banacek – episode – "No Sign of the Cross" –  Chief Frank Mendoza (1972)
Cannon – episode – "A Long Way Down" –  Ben (1972) 
Adam-12 – episode – "Airdrop" – Sgt. Jesse Marco (1972)
Cannon – episode – "Trial by Terror" – Sgt. Taggart (1973)
Kung Fu – episodes – "The Cenotaph: Parts 1 & 2" –  Lame Dog (1974)
Harry O – episode – "Forty Reasons to Kill: Parts 1 & 2" –  Deputy Gutierrez (1974)
Kung Fu – episode – "Flight to Orion" – Indian Leader (1975)
Police Woman – episode – "Incident Near a Black and White" – Gates (1975)
The Six Million Dollar Man – episode – "Divided Loyalty" –  Boris (1975)
Police Woman – episode – "Paradise Mall" –  Det. Ed (1975)
Emergency! – episode – "905-Wild" ... Officer Garcia (1975)
Police Woman – episode – "Blast" –  Gomez (1975)
The Blue Knight – episode – "A Slight Case of Murder" (1976)
Land of the Lost – episode – "Medicine Man" – Lone Wolf (1976)
The Six Million Dollar Man – episode – "The Thunderbird Connection" – Akmed Khaduri (1976)
Bigfoot and Wildboy – "Ranger Lucas" (1977)The Incredible Hulk – episode – "Rainbow's End" – Thomas Logan (1978)
 Police Woman – episode – "A Shadow on the Sea" – Delgado (1978)Galactica 1980 – episode – "Space Croppers"  Hector Alonzo (1980)Lou Grant – episode – "Indians" – Howard Sweetwater (1980)Dan August: The Jealousy Factor – TV Movie – Sergeant Joe Rivera (1980)Dan August: Once Is Never Enough – TV Movie – Sergeant Joe Rivera (1980)Disney's Wonderful World – episode – "Sultan and the Rock Star" – Big Joe Ironwood (1980) Dan August: Murder, My Friend – TV Movie – Joe Rivera (1980)Quincy, M.E. – episode – "Vigil of Fear" –  Ramon (1981) Diff'rent Strokes – episode – "Burial Ground" – John Longwalker (1982)Simon & Simon – episode – "The Cop Who Came to Dinner" – Clerk (1986)Santa Barbara – episode – Episode #1.1455. #1.1458, and #1.1459 – Shaman (1990)MacGyver – episode – "The Mountain of Youth" – Baba (1992)
 Northern Exposure – "Sleeping With The Enemy" – Leston (1993)Murder, She Wrote – episode – "Northern Explosion" – Joe Quill (1994)Star Trek: The Next Generation – episode – "Journey's End"  – Anthwara   (1994)Diagnosis Murder – episode – "The Restless Remains" – Mr. Clarke (1994)The Magnificent Seven – episode – "Ghosts of the Confederacy" – Seminole Chief (1998)Walker, Texas Ranger – episodes – "Tribe, and War Cry" –  Judge Henry Fivekills (1998)Walker, Texas Ranger – episode – "Way of the Warrior"- Shaman (1999)Star Trek Voyager – episode – "The Fight" – Chakotay's Great-Grandfather (1999)Roswell – episode – "River Dog" – Season 1 episode 7 (1999)Walker, Texas Ranger'' – episode – "White Buffalo" – Ned Grey Fox (2000)

References

External links
 

1926 births
2017 deaths
American male film actors
American opera singers
American male television actors
People from Franklin, Louisiana
People from Greater Los Angeles
Male actors from Louisiana
Singers from Louisiana
American people of Native American descent
American people of Spanish descent
American people of French descent
Western (genre) television actors